Woodcliff Lake is the name of a reservoir in Woodcliff Lake and portions of Hillsdale and Park Ridge, in Bergen County, New Jersey, United States. It was created circa 1903 by damming the Pascack Brook and is also fed by the Bear Brook which joins the Pascack at the reservoir. The creation of the lake led what had been the Borough of Woodcliff to change its name to Woodcliff Lake, to match the name of the new reservoir. The reservoir is owned by Suez North America, a private utility.

Water released into the Pascack Brook flows downstream into the Oradell Reservoir. When the water levels become low, the old stone bridge over the Pascack Brook becomes visible just south of the causeway.

Several species of fish inhabit the reservoir including largemouth bass, smallmouth bass, carp, pumpkinseed, bluegill, brown and yellow bullheads, as well as large schools of both yellow and white perch. Fishing is restricted to those with a valid New Jersey Fishing License and a Watershed Permit obtained by payment of a yearly fee to the owner of the reservoir, Suez North America. Numerous waterfowl including various species of ducks and heron also live on and around the reservoir.

The reservoir may be crossed at two points, either by a narrow road over the dam, originally Dam Road and changed to Church Road when Christ Lutheran Church was built at the Pascack Road entrance, or a higher traffic county road over a causeway, Woodcliff Avenue.  On the eastern side of the reservoir is the New Jersey Transit Pascack Valley Line, with the Woodcliff Lake station stop at Woodcliff Avenue.

On March 11, 2003, Governor of New Jersey Jim McGreevey visited the nearby Lake Tappan reservoir and proposed protecting it, Woodcliff Lake and their tributaries with Category 1 water purity status.

See also
Lake DeForest
 List of dams and reservoirs in New Jersey
 New Milford Plant of the Hackensack Water Company
 Hackensack Water Company Complex

References

External links
 United Water (utility)
Summary of Monthly Hydrologic Conditions in New Jersey

Bodies of water of Bergen County, New Jersey
Reservoirs in New Jersey
Hillsdale, New Jersey
Park Ridge, New Jersey
Woodcliff Lake, New Jersey
United Water